Sar Chah (also Romanized as Sar Chāh) is a village in Binalud Rural District, in the Central District of Nishapur County, Razavi Khorasan Province, Iran. At the 2006 census, its population was 1,674, in 423 families.

References 

Populated places in Nishapur County